The basketball tournaments of National Collegiate Athletic Association (Philippines) 84th season hosted by the Mapúa Institute of Technology began on June 28 at the Araneta Coliseum with Metropolitan Manila Development Authority chairman Bayani Fernando as the keynote speaker (however, Fernando was later tasked to lead the cleanup efforts caused by Typhoon Frank, he sent his daughter instead). All subsequent elimination round games will be held at Cuneta Astrodome. The theme of the season is "To The Fore at 84".

The games began on June 28 at the Araneta Coliseum, Quezon City with a quadruple-header.

The first two games along with seniors' games every Wednesday and Friday will be aired on Studio 23. The remaining elimination round games were at the Cuneta Astrodome at Pasay, except for the last game which was held at the Araneta Coliseum.

The San Beda Red Lions and the San Sebastian Staglets both defended their titles successfully, with the Red Lions winning against the JRU Heavy Bombers in three games and the Staglets sweeping the elimination round and their finals series against the Letran Squires. San Beda is now the three-time champion while San Sebastian won their fourth consecutive title.

New rules
The NCAA Policy Board approved two new rule changes concerning the basketball events:
The "challenge" rule: A head coach can challenge a three-point shot to the referee via the use of a video replay; if the challenge is revoked, the team is charged with a timeout or assessed with a technical foul if it has no timeouts left.
Hand check fouls will be disallowed.
Fouls away from the ball during inbounds would result in automatic unsportsmanlike fouls.

Seniors' tournament

Teams

Preseason
With Caloy Garcia leaving the team and being elevated to the head coach position at Welcoat Dragons, Red Bull Barako assistant coach Gee Abanilla was tapped in as the new CSB Blazers coach for the 84th season. Abanilla coached the Barakos for a few wins while head coach Yeng Guiao was away on the campaign trail at the 2007 election.

Elimination round

Team standings

Match-up results

Scores

Postseason teams

San Beda Red Lions
The defending champions opened the season with a 29-point blowout against season host Mapua; it seems another championship run by San Beda as they won 5 consecutive victories, including an overtime thriller against San Sebastian. However, CSB put their game against San Beda under protest as Sam Ekwe donned last year's uniform. The NCAA Management Committee ruled in favor of CSB, on the same day JRU used their outside shooting to shock San Beda giving them two losses in one day.

The Red Lions recovered with a win against their marquee game against Letran and PCU but Mapua gave their own version of an upset when they used slow ball against the Red Lions to win the game. San Beda recovered with wins against Perpetual, revenge against both CSB and JRU and another close game against San Sebastian. The Red Lions capped off the elimination round as the #1 seed by sending Letran to the classification round for 2nd-4th places after Borgie Hermida scored on a buzzer-beaten to make them win the game in overtime at the Araneta Coliseum.

Letran Knights
Letran won the first six games of the season, including a come-from-behind win against UPHSD,  but faltered in the first round finale against San Beda in which the ball slipped from Reymar Gutilban's hands to land at the end lines in the dying seconds. After a win against CSB, Letran lost the next two games against JRU and San Sebastian. After a win against also-ran UPHSD, Mapua whipped the Knights in the Battle of Intramuros despite not scoring a field-goal in the fourth quarter.

Continuing the pattern, Letran beat PCU in their last NCAA game since they'll take a leave of absence. In the elimination round finale, Letran was on the verge of winning a twice-to-beat advantage but a game went into overtime. In the extra period, Letran was leading by 4 points when San Beda rallied to lead by two. RJ Jazul scored on a driving lay-up with 5 seconds remaining but Borgie Hermida scored a buzzer-beater with a looper from the free-throw line to seal San Beda's third straight semifinal appearance with the twice to beat advantage. Letran now had to go through a series of games to determine if they'll qualify for the Final Four.

JRU Heavy Bombers
The Bombers were blown out by Letran on opening day and were beaten by San Sebastian in the closing minutes in their second game. The Heavy Bombers regrouped and won their next eight games, including an upset against San Beda where they capitalized on their streaky three-point shooting. Ironically it was San Beda that finished the streak when they had a decisive run in the fourth quarter to prevent a JRU comeback.

San Sebastian continued their mastery of the Bombers with another win against them. After a win against PCU, JRU had an outside chance of clinching a twice to beat advantage provided they beat Mapua which was on a must-win situation. The Cardinals were riding on a three-game winning streak and capitalized on the momentum to force three teams tied with 9-5 records; with the loss of Letran against San Beda, those four teams would undergo a series of games to determine which teams will clinch the nos. 2 to 4 seeds.

Mapua Cardinals
Mapua was blown away by the Red Lions on opening day with a 29-point drubbing, but the Cardinals recovered by winning their next 3 games in a span of a week. After a win against CSB, Letran won the first Battle of Intramuros, and they were beaten by JRU and San Sebastian. Mapua dealt San Beda their only loss in the second round with a slow-down game in which they took a shot at the very end of the shot clock to throw off the Red Lions' fast-paced game, with Kelvin dela Peña proclaiming on the post-game interview that they're back.

The Cardinals were dealt with a disappointing loss against the also-ran CSB Blazers, and they had to win all of their games to force a tie for the last qualifying berth. With them winning all of their games, including the second Battle of Intramuros, and a do-or-die game against JRU in their last game of the eliminations, the Cardinals forced a four-way tie for #2.

The Cardinals became the only team to beat the Red Lions twice this season, with two consecutive win in the second round and the first game of their semifinals match-up.

San Sebastian Golden Stags
San Sebastian lost its first two games against UPHSD and Mapua, but the Stags emerged victorious against JRU in their third game. After losing to the Red Lions, they didn't lose their faith in nothing more than joining the final four this season and "reliving the glory days" (their consecutive domination in the 90's) as they started their 8 winning streak against PCU and CSB at the end of the first round and extending their run in the second round as they beat PCU for the second time dethroning the Mapua Cardinals at the number 4 spot, revenge on both UPHSD and Letran and then defeating both JRU and CSB. They lost again to the San Beda Red Lions in a close match. Ending at 9-5 did not assure them of a final four seat even if they finished one match earlier than Mapúa, JRU and Letran as they lost against JRU and losing again to Mapúa in the Head-to-Head match for the final four. Even if the stags was granted the #2 seed in the face-off match, they were not able to enter the final four in the season 84.

San Sebastian were the only team to win against JRU Heavy Bombers in the Elimination Round. Sharing with the said team the highest winning streak of 8 matches.

Classification games
After a tight race for the final four, it was announced that the Management Committee will meet to determine how to break the ties.

After the games of September 5, it was decided that the system used by FIBA would be used to break ties and assign seedings.

After San Beda's win against Letran, four teams were tied from 2nd to 5th, with only 4 teams advancing to the semifinals. The four teams were ranked on the basis of their head-to-head records.

The four teams will then undergo a mini-tournament to determine the 2nd, 3rd and 4th seeds. The winners of the first round will meet to decide the 2nd seed (a de facto best of three series) while the losers will meet to decide the 4th seed. The loser of that game will be eliminated from contention while the winner will face San Beda in the semifinals.

Bracket

Classification round

Second-seed playoff

Fourth-seed playoff

Bracket

Semifinals
San Beda and JRU have the twice-to-beat advantage. They only have to win once, while their opponents, twice, to progress.

San Beda vs. Mapua

San Beda and Mapua exchange leads until late in the 4th quarter in which Mapua led 51-38 when San Beda had a 13-2 run until the last 12.5 seconds. Ian Mazo turned the ball over for Mapua which led to San Beda taking a last crack at the basket; after the time out, Pong Escobal missed a hurried three-pointer and Mapua extended the series to a deciding second game.

Mapua would run out of gas in the second game as San Beda coach Franklie Lim observed that they were tired after an extended playoff run; although they gave the Red Lions a fight, a shot by Ogie Menor in the final 1:10 put the game out of reach for the Red Lions to clinch their finals berth.

JRU vs. Letran

With Letran up by three in the final 1:43, John Melegrito turned the ball over for a John Wilson lay-up. Mark Cagoco's defense caused RJ Jazul to turn the ball over anew, and James Sena scored in the next possession to put JRU up for good. Marvin Hayes helped in defending Jazul to force another turnover; Jazul fouled Cagoco to stop the clock. As Cagoco split his free throws, Jazul has a last chance to tie the game but Wilson blocked his shot as time expired, leading JRU to their first finals series since 2001.

Finals

Finals Most Valuable Player:

Controversies

Wrong uniform
San Beda's Sam Ekwe wore a different uniform in San Beda's 71-54 victory against CSB; he instead wore the 2007 uniform. As a result, CSB filed a protest that could overturn San Beda's victory.

The Management Committee forfeited San Beda's win against CSB on a decision released on July 23.

Awards
The season's awardees were awarded at halftime of the first game of the finals series. They are:
Most Valuable Player: 
Rookie of the Year: 
Mythical team:

Defensive Player of the Year:
Players of the week:
June 28-July 6: RJ Jazul (Letran)
July 7–14: Kelvin dela Peña (Mapúa)
July 15–21: Pong Escobal (San Beda)
July 22–28: James Sena (JRU)
July 29-August 5: Sam Ekwe (San Beda)
August 6–13: Jason Ballesteros (San Sebastian)
August 14–20: James Sena (JRU)

Juniors' tournament
Games began on June 30 at the Cuneta Astrodome at Pasay.

Elimination round

Keith Agovida of JRU broke the NCAA scoring record of 70 points held by Letran's Marlon Bola Bola; as he scored 82 points in JRU's 127-49 rout of Malayan Science.

It was the first time in NCAA history that the San Beda Red Cubs failed to enter the Final Four round and was also the first time that a team had swept the eliminations since 2000. The San Sebastian Staglets therefore advanced to the finals automatically.

Team standings

Rivalry games

Bracket

Stepladder semifinals

First round

Second round

Finals

Finals Most Valuable Player:

Awards
Most Valuable Player: 
Rookie of the Year: 
Mythical team:

Defensive Player of the Year:

Broadcast notes
ABS-CBN's UHF channel Studio 23 is the sole coverer of the games, covering all men's games  since opening day held on a Wednesday and Friday (except for the last two games on opening day). 101.9 For Life!, ABS-CBN's FM radio station, delivers updates on game dates.

NCAA College Hoops airs every Monday afternoons as a supplement for the main NCAA coverage. It is hosted by Andrei Felix and San Beda courtside reporter Pia Boren.

Playoff broadcasters are:

Champion rosters

San Beda Red Lions

San Sebastian Staglets

See also
UAAP Season 71 basketball tournaments
2008 Philippine Collegiate Championship

References

84
2008–09 in Philippine college basketball